Camfetamine (N-methyl-3-phenyl-norbornan-2-amine) is a stimulant drug closely related to the appetite suppressant fencamfamine, being its N-methyl homologue. It has been sold as a designer drug following the banning of mephedrone and related substituted cathinone derivatives in many countries, and reportedly has slightly stronger stimulant effects than fencamfamine, but with correspondingly more severe side effects.

See also 
 Dimethocaine
 Ethylphenidate
 Methiopropamine

References 

Designer drugs
Norepinephrine-dopamine releasing agents
Stimulants
Norbornanes